Okhotsk may refer to:

Extraterrestrial
Okhotsk (crater), a crater on Mars
4042 Okhotsk, a main-belt asteroid discovered at Kitami Observatory

Russia
Okhotsk, an urban-type settlement in Khabarovsk Krai, Russia
Sea of Okhotsk, a sea named after the Russian settlement
Okhotsk Airport, an airport in Okhotsk
Okhotsk High, a high pressure system over the sea
Okhotsk Plate, a tectonic plate

Japan
, a Hokkaidō subprefecture in Japan, named after the Sea of Okhotsk
Okhotsk General Development Bureau, a name of the subprefecture from 2009
Okhotsk (train), a train service between Sapporo and Abashiri
Okhotsk Monbetsu Airport, an airport in Monbetsu, Hokkaidō
Okhotsk Fuji, an alternative name of Mount Shari

Other uses
Okhotsk culture, archaeological culture in the lands surrounding the Sea of Okhotsk

See also
Okhotsky (disambiguation)